Nowy Służewiec, also known as Służewiec Nowy, is a neighbourhood of the city of Warsaw, Poland, located within the district of Włochy, within the Municipal Information System area (neighbourhood) of Okęcie.

History 
By 1921, Nowy Służewiec was part of the municipality (gmina) of Wilanów. Since 20 October 1933, it functioned as one of its 18 gromadas (village assemblies). In 1943, Nowy Służewiec had been incorporated into the municipality (gmina) of Okęcie. In 1943, the village had 136 inhabitants.

On 15 May 1951, the municipality of Okęcie, including Nowy Służewiec, were incorporated into the city of Warsaw.

Notes

References 

Nowy Sluzewiec